Benedict Jacka (born September 25, 1980) is a British author, best known for his Alex Verus series.

Biography
Jacka was born in England and attended the City of London School. He later attended Cambridge University, where he graduated with a Bachelors in philosophy and met his editor Sophie Hicks from Ed Victor Ltd. His first novels were three children's fantasy novels that didn’t get published, with that honour going to a children's non-fantasy novel called To Be A Ninja (Later: Ninja: The Beginning). From 2000 on, he developed a fantasy setting for which he wrote four books, whose main characters were teenage elementals. None of the four were published. In 2009, he decided to try again with an adult character and a more information-based ability. Three years later, in 2012, he published the first book of the Alex Verus series, two more followed the same year. Jacka married in 2015 to Rolari Kuti.

Critical reception for Jacka's work has been mostly positive. Of the Alex Verus series, SF Site has cited the series' characters and chapter cliffhangers as highlights. SF Crowsnest gave an overall positive review for Cursed, while stating it was "an enjoyable, if unchallenging, read".

Bibliography

Alex Verus series
 Fated (2012)
 Cursed (2012)
 Taken (2012)
 Chosen (2013)
 Hidden (2014)
 Veiled (2015)
 Burned (2016)
 Bound (2017)
 Marked (2018)
 Fallen (2019)
 Forged (2020)
 Risen (2021)

Additionally, in June 2021 Jacka released a novella which takes place between books 6 and 7, "Favours", and in October 2022 one which takes place after book 12, "Gardens".

Ninja series
 Ninja: The Beginning (2005)
 Ninja: The Battle (2007)

References

External links
 
 

Living people
1980 births
21st-century British novelists
English fantasy writers
British thriller writers
Urban fantasy writers
Alumni of the University of Cambridge
British male novelists
21st-century British short story writers
21st-century British male writers